The following is a timeline of the history of the city of Jakarta, Indonesia.

Prior to 19th century

 397 CE – The port town known as Sunda Kelapa.
 Mid 5th century – The region around the port was under Hindu Tarumanagara kingdom's rule, according to Tugu inscription discovered in North Jakarta.
 13th to 16th century – The port of Sunda Kalapa was the main port of Hindu Sunda Kingdom, served the capital, Pakuan Pajajaran (now Bogor), located about 60 km inland south
 1513 – Portuguese ships arrived.
 1522 – Padrão erected in Sunda Kelapa to mark Sunda-Portuquese treaty.
 1527
 Fatahillah, on behalf of the Sultanate of Demak, conquers the Portuguese in Sunda Kalapa.
 Sunda Kalapa renamed Jayakarta.
 1610 – Dutch trading post established.
 1619
 Jan Pieterszoon Coen of the Dutch East India Company seizes the port of Jayakarta from the Sultanate of Banten.
 City renamed Batavia.
 1628–1629 – Sultan Agung of Mataram launched Siege of Batavia.
 1695 – Gereja Sion built.
 1699 – An earthquake in Batavia causes the collapse of 49 buildings and leaves 28 dead.
 1710 – Stadhuis (town hall) built.
 1740 – Massacre of ethnic Chinese by Dutch East Indies troops.
 1744 – Amsterdam Gate built.
 1778 – Royal Batavian Society of Arts and Sciences founded.
 1797 – Kebon Jahe Kober cemetery established.

19th century
 1804 – Negara Palace built.
 1811 – British took power.
 1814
 Dutch rule of city restored.
 Theatre built.
 1821 – Schouwburg Weltevreden concert hall built.
 1829 – Hotel de Provence established.
 1834 – 1834 Java earthquake 
 1836 – 3 February: the first government steamboat, Willem I, arrived at the Batavia shipyard of Island Onrust. This was followed by the arrival of another steamer from the "Nederland" Royal Mail line in September 1871.
 1837 – Frederik-Hendrik citadel built.
 1851 – Medical school founded.
 1853
 "Society for the promotion of industry and agriculture" established.
 By the end of 1853, the first exhibition of agricultural products and native arts and crafts was held in Batavia.
 1860 – Gymnasium William III established.
 1864
 March – a concession was granted to the Netherlands Indian Railway Company for the construction of a railway between Batavia and Buitenzorg.
 Zoo established by Vereneging Plantenen Dierentuin.
 1868 – Gedung Gajah museum opens.
 1869 
The opening of Suez canal reduces the voyage from Europe to Batavia to 5 weeks.
Batavia Tramway Company started the horse-tram line, 'nr 1: Old Batavia' (now Kota Tua). The route started at Amsterdam Poort in the northern end of Prinsenstraat (now Jalan Cengkeh) and then reached Molenvliet (Jalan Gajah Madah) and Harmonie.
 1870
 Artesian wells built.
 Jakarta Kota Station built (approximate date).
 1871 
15 September: Batavia-Buitenzorg railway line completed.
16 September: Batavia-Buitenzorg railway line's service was opened
 1877 – A boom occurred in the international trade activity with Europe and the increase of shipping led to the construction of a new harbor at Tanjung Priok between 1877 and 1883.
 1878 – 1 June: Commemoration of the first centenary of the Batavian Society of Arts and Sciences was held on 1 June 1878.
 1879 – Gambir Palace built.
 1880 – Population of Batavia: 96,957.
 1881
1 December: the first dock of the Netherlands Indian Dry Docks Company was opened on Pulau Amsterdam (Eiland Amsterdam, present Pulau Untung Jawa) in the roadsteads of Batavia.
 Batavia-Buitenzorg-Cicurug railway line completed.
 1882
Batavia-Buitenzorg-Cicurug-Sukabumi railway line completed.
Horse-tram lines were reconstructed into steam tram lines.
 1883
Batavia-Buitenzorg-Cicurug-Sukabumi-Cianjur railway line completed.
12 August to 19 November: an exhibition of agricultural products and native arts and crafts was held at Batavia's Koningsplein. 
Tsunami
Dutch Indies Telephone Company established in Batavia.
 1884
 Batavia-Buitenzorg-Bandung railway line completed.
November – an exhibition of Javanese crafts and arts was held in the Zoological Gardens (now Taman Ismail Marzuki).
 Weltevreden Station built.
 1886 – Tanjung Priuk Station completed, connecting Tanjung Priok harbor with Batavia.
 1888 – 15 January: an anatomical and bacterial laboratory established in Batavia.
 1886 – Tanjung Priok harbor built.
 1894 – 1 November: Batavia-Surabaya connected with the opening of the railway section Tasikmalaya-Maos
 1895 – 16 July: Pasteur Institute established.
 1898 – Population of Batavia: 115,567.
 1899 – The electric train operated. It was the first ever electric train in the Kingdom of Netherlands.

20th century

1900s–1940s
 1901 – Jakarta Cathedral built.
 1903 – "City council" created.
 1906 – Gambir Market begins.
 1910 – Jatinegara Station built.
 1912 – Jakarta Stock Exchange established.
 1918
 Municipal water company created.
 Population: 234,697.
 1920 – Jakarta Flood Canal built.
 1922 – Cut Mutiah Mosque founded.
 1928 – Persija Jakarta football club founded.
 1930 – Population: 533,000.
 1931 – Old Indonesia football derby begins.
 1932 – Bioscoop Metropool built.
 1940 – Kemayoran Airport opens.
 1942 – City occupied by Japanese.
 1945 – Suwiryo becomes mayor.
 1948
 Kebayoran Baru development begins.
 Daan Jahja becomes military governor.
 Population: 823,000.
 1949
 City renamed Djakarta.
 Kodam Jaya, Akademi Nasional, and National Archives of Indonesia established.
 Ikada field renamed Merdeka Square.
 Istana Gambir renamed Istana Merdeka.

1950s–1990s
 1950
 Suwiryo becomes mayor again.
 State university established in Jakarta.
 Major expansion of Jakarta's Administrative Boundaries (then called "Kotapraja"); Kotabaru Kebayoran Baru and Tjililitan airfield (Now Halim Perdanakusuma International Airport) amongst the new areas annexed from West Java (now Banten Province).
 1951 – Sjamsuridjal becomes mayor.
 1952
 Population: 1,782,000.
 First Section of The Road connecting Kotabaru Kebayoran Baru into then-City Proper (Gadjah Mada-Hayam Wuruk-Medan Merdeka Street Axis), Mohammad Husni Thamrin Street construction completed.
 1953
 Sudiro becomes mayor.
 Universitas Kristen Indonesia established.
 Bank Indonesia headquartered in Jakarta.
 1955 –  Second and the final section of the road connecting Kotabaru Kebayoran Baru into then-city proper (Gadjah Mada-Hayam Wuruk-Medan Merdeka Street Axis), Sudirman Street construction Completed.
 1957 – Water Treatment Plant Pejompangan I created.
 1958 – SMA Negeri 8 Jakarta Public High School established.
 1960 – Soemarno Sosroatmodjo becomes governor.
 1961
 Special Capital Region of Jakarta (province) created.
 Population: 2,906,533.
 1962
 Hotel Indonesia opens.
 Selamat Datang Monument and Gelora Bung Karno Stadium built.
 4th Asian Games held.
 1964 – Henk Ngantung becomes governor.
 1965
 Soemarno Sosroatmodjo becomes governor again.
 Balai Sarbini (concert hall) and Tanjung Priok-Cililitan Bypass built.
 Kompas newspaper begins publication.
 30 September Movement.
 1966
 Ali Sadikin becomes governor.
 Jakarta government divided into 5 self-governing cities: Central Jakarta (Jakarta Pusat), West Jakarta (Jakarta Barat), South Jakarta (Jakarta Selatan), East Jakarta (Jakarta Timur), and North Jakarta (Jakarta Utara).
 Water Treatment Plant Pejompangan II created.
 Ragunan Zoo and Ancol Dreamland resort open.
 1967 – YARSI University established.
 1968
 Jakarta Fair begins.
 Wisma Delima opens in Jalan Jaksa.
 Taman Ismail Marzuki Art Center opens.
 1970 – 16th Asia Pacific Film Festival held.
 1971
 Prambors FM radio begins broadcasting.
 Tempo magazine begins publication.
 Population: 4,576,009.
 1974
 January: Anti-Japanese Malari incident occurs.
 Jakarta History Museum opens.
 Binus University founded.
 Betawi Cultural Heritage District established in Condet.
 1975
Wayang Museum of puppetry established.
 Taman Mini Indonesia Indah and Museum Indonesia opensF.
 National Monument (Indonesia) built.
 Jakarta's last major Change within its Administrative Boundaries (as of March 2022).
 1976
 Blok G government highrise built as a benchmark for other highrise in Jakarta.
 Museum Seni Rupa dan Keramik established.
 1977
 Tjokropranolo becomes governor.
 Museum Bahari established.
 Taman Prasasti Museum opens.
 1978
 Istiqlal Mosque, Jakarta built.
 Jagorawi Toll Road opens, linking Bogor, Ciawi, and Jakarta.
 Textile Museum opens.
 1979
 Jakarta hosts 1979 Southeast Asian Games
 Sister city relationship established with Jeddah, Saudi Arabia.
 1980
 National Library of Indonesia and Jakarta Foreign Correspondents Club founded.
 Population: 6,503,449.
 Ratu Plaza, the First Superblock Development in Jakarta and in Indonesia, Opened.
 1981 – SMA Negeri 68 Jakarta public high school established.
 1982 – R. Soeprapto becomes governor.
 1983 – 25 April: The Jakarta Post newspaper begins publication.
 1984
 12 September: Tanjung Priok massacre occurs.
 October: Anti-Chinese bombings.
 Sister city relationships established with Islamabad, Pakistan, and Seoul, South Korea.
 1985
 Soekarno–Hatta International Airport opens; Kemayoran Airport closes.
 Mercu Buana University established.
 1986
 Dunia Fantasi theme park opens in Ancol Dreamland.
 Sister city relationship established with Rotterdam, Netherlands.
 1987
 Wiyogo Atmodarminto becomes governor.
 Jakarta host 1987 Southeast Asian Games
 1988 – Jakarta–Cikampek Toll Road opens.
 1990
 Mal Kelapa Gading opens.
 Lippo Cikarang starts.
 Sister city relationship established with Los Angeles, USA.
 1991
 Jakarta Fair venue moved from Merdeka Square to Kemayoran.
 Plaza Indonesia, a High-end Shopping Centre in Menteng, Central Jakarta, opens with an accompanying opening ceremony by The-then President of Indonesia, Soeharto.
 Sister city relationship established with Casablanca, Morocco.
 1992
 Soerjadi Soedirdja becomes governor.
 Jakarta Convention Center opens (approximate date).
 Sister city relationship established with Beijing, China.
 1993
 Mayapada Tower built.
 Purna Bhakti Pertiwi Museum opens.
 Sister city relationship established with Berlin, Germany.
 1995
 "Kenduri Nasional", national commemoration to celebrate 50th years of Indonesian Independence held in Merdeka Square.
 Plaza Senayan, a high-end Shopping Mall in Tanah Abang, Central Jakarta (Culturally Considered Part of South Jakarta), opens.
 Sister city relationship established with Paris, France.
 Population: 9,160,500 (estimate).
 1996
 Wisma 46, the highest building in Jakarta & Indonesia until surpassed 2016, opens.
 Society for Interreligious Dialogue established.
 27 July: Indonesian government forces attacked the head office of the Indonesian Democratic Party in Menteng, Central Jakarta, which was being occupied by supporters of recently ousted party leader Megawati Sukarnoputri.
 1997
 Sutiyoso becomes governor.
 Jakarta Tower construction begins, yet stopped due to Asian financial crisis.
 Jakarta host 1997 Southeast Asian Games
 1998 – Riots against Suharto's Government.
 1999 – Jakarta International Film Festival begins.
 2000
 Jakarta Stock Exchange bombing.
 Population density: 12,200 people per square kilometer.

21st century

2000s
 2003 – 5 August: Marriott Hotel bombing.
 2004
 15 January: TransJakarta, the bus rapid transit system of Jakarta, starts operations.
 9 September: Australian Embassy bombing.
 Jakarta Monorail construction begins, yet halted months later.
 Asian Network of Major Cities 21 meets in Jakarta.
 2005
 Food scare.
 Jakarta International Java Jazz Festival begins.
 Ritz-Carlton Jakarta opens.
 2006 – Indosiar Television Tower built.
 2007
 8 August: 2007 Jakarta gubernatorial election held; Fauzi Bowo wins.
 Indonesia Stock Exchange formed.
 Flood.
 The Peak Twin Towers built.
 2008 – Messiah Cathedral opens.
 2009
 Aula Simfonia Jakarta opens.
 Hotel bombings.

2010s
 2010 – Population: 9,607,787; population density: 14,600 people per square kilometer.
 2011
 Jakarta host 2011 Southeast Asian Games with Palembang
 Population: 10,187,595.
 2012
 Mata Elang International Stadium opens.
 MRT Jakarta construction begins.
 October: Joko Widodo becomes governor.
 2013
 January: Flooding.
 Population: 9,988,329.
 2014 – Basuki Tjahaja Purnama becomes governor.
 2016 – 4 November: an Islamist mass protest took place on 4 November 2016 in Jakarta, Indonesia. It was attended by an estimated 50,000–200,000 protesters, and was aimed against the Governor of Jakarta Basuki Tjahaja Purnama (popularly known as "Ahok"), for an alleged blasphemy of the Quran, the Islamic holy book.
 2017
 Anies Baswedan elected governor
  Former Jakarta Governor Basuki Tjahaja Purnama sentenced to two years in prison for blasphemy
 2018
 18 August – 2 September: Jakarta host 2018 Asian Games with Palembang
 Jakarta host 2018 Asian Para Games.
 2019
24 March: The first phase of the Jakarta MRT opens.
22 May: A mass protest against the 2019 Indonesian general election results, which later turned into a riot, took place on 22 May 2019 in Jakarta, Indonesia.
23–24 September: Mass protests led by students took place in front of the DPR/MPR Building.
1 December: Jakarta LRT The first phase is opens.

2020s
2020
1 January: Flood strikes the Jakarta Metropolitan Area on 1 January 2020.
2022
 Jakarta International Stadium opens.
 Jakarta ePrix held.

See also
 History of Jakarta
 List of Governors of Jakarta
 List of colonial buildings and structures in Jakarta
 Other names of Jakarta
 Greater Jakarta
 Urbanization in Indonesia
 Timeline of Indonesian history

References

This article incorporates information from the Indonesian Wikipedia and German Wikipedia.

Bibliography

Published in the 20th century
 
 
 
 Susan Abeyasekere. Jakarta: A History. Singapore: Oxford University Press, 1987.
 Abidin Kusno, "Modern Beacon and Traditional Polity: Jakarta in the Time of Sukarno," chapter 2 Behind the Postcolonial: Architecture, Urban Space and Political Cultures in Indonesia (London: Routledge, 2000) 49–70.

Published in the 21st century

External links

 

Years in Indonesia
 
Jakarta
Jakarta-related lists
Jakarta
Jakarta